Gabriel DeAndre Freeman (born November 5, 1985) is an American professional basketball player for the Halifax Hurricanes of the National Basketball League of Canada (NBL). He previously played for the Rochester Razorsharks of the Premier Basketball League (PBL) in the United States. Freeman also has experience with the London Lightning in the NBL Canada and steered them to a 2012 Finals victory. He won the ASEAN Basketball League championship with the Philippine Patriots in 2009 and led the San Miguel Beermen to a 2009 PBA Fiesta Conference title earlier that year. On August 14, 2018, Freeman was traded to the St. John's Edge in exchange for Alex "Superman" Johnson, a 2018 First Round Draft Pick, and Future Considerations.

Early life and college
Born in Phoenix, Freeman graduated from McClintock High School of Tempe, Arizona in 2004. He attended Southern Utah University but never played a game for the Thunderbirds basketball team. At Mesa Community College, Freeman was a first-team All-ACCAC selection in the 2006–07 season and averaged 16.8 points and 8.9 rebounds.

Professional career
Freeman signed with Correcaminos UAT Reynosa of the Mexican LNBP in 2007 and averaged 22.6 points and 8.1 rebounds in ten games.

For part of the 2008–09 season, Freeman played for the Albany Patroons in the CBA. Albany made the CBA Finals but lost to the Lawton-Fort Sill Cavalry. In 15 games with the Patroons, he averaged 14.3 points per game and 9.7 rebounds per game. He wore jersey number 34.

He was chosen by the San Miguel Beermen as an import in the middle of the 2008–09 season. He played 24 games and averaged 22.3 points, 15.5 rebounds, and 1.3 assists. Freeman was awarded the Best Import of the conference. In the following season, Freeman played 29 games for San Miguel and averaged 21.6 points, 17.3 rebounds, and 1.5 assists.

The Philippine Patriots of the ASEAN Basketball League signed Freeman to replace Brandon Powell in January 2010.

He did not fail his team and with a hard-fought battle between Ginebra and their fans, he led the San Miguel franchise to its 18th championship, which was also his career first. PBA fans credited his heart and hard work as a big factor in their victory.

On July 12, 2010, Freeman signed with the Townsville Crocodiles of the NBL of Australia.

Freeman re-signed with the Philippine Patriots in December 2010. In the first game of the ASEAN semifinals on January 22, 2011, Freeman scored 36 points and made 11 rebounds and 5 assists in an 88–83 victory over the KL Dragons.

On October 21, 2011, it was announced that Freeman had made the final 12-man roster for the National Basketball League of Canada's London Lightning. He wore jersey number 25. Finding immediate success with the Lightning, Freeman was named the first ever NBL Canada Player of the Week for the week ending November 6, an award he would win again for the weeks ending January 1 and March 4, 2012. The Lightning would go on to finish the regular season at 28–8 and gain home-court advantage throughout the playoffs.

On March 14, 2012, Freeman was named the NBL Canada's inaugural Rogers Communications Most Valuable Player.  More importantly, however, on March 25 he led the Lightning to a 116–92 victory over the Halifax Rainmen in a deciding Game Five of the NBL Canada Finals to win the NBL Canada's inaugural championship. In addition to his regular-season MVP award, Freeman was named the Finals' MVP.

Freeman signed with the PBA team Barako Bull Energy on April 2, 2012. In 7 games, Freeman averaged 21.7 points, 14.0 rebounds, 2.71 assists, and 1.0 steal.

Freeman returned to the Philippine Patriots on September 18, 2012. In January 2013, Freeman again signed with the San Miguel Beermen. On February 26, 2013, the ASEAN league suspended Freeman  for a game and issued him a fine for unsportsmanlike conduct. Freeman later suffered an injury and was replaced by Justin Williams.

In 2014, a recovered Freeman played with the Rochester Razorsharks in the Premier Basketball League (PBL). He led his team to a PBL title and was named league and playoff most valuable player, with per-game averages of 19 points and 11 rebounds.

On November 19, 2015, Freeman signed with the Saint John Mill Rats of the National Basketball League of Canada (NBL). He joined the team with returning player and former Most Valuable Player in Anthony Anderson.

On August 28, 2018, Freeman signed with the St. John's Edge of the National Basketball League of Canada (NBL).

Personal life
Freeman has established a foundation in London, Ontario for kids without means to play basketball. He is a mechanic and worked out of a motorcycle shop in Phoenix.

References

1985 births
Living people
African-American basketball players
Albany Patroons players
American expatriate basketball people in Australia
American expatriate basketball people in Canada
American expatriate basketball people in the Philippines
American men's basketball players
Barako Bull Energy players
Barangay Ginebra San Miguel players
Basketball players from Phoenix, Arizona
Halifax Hurricanes players
London Lightning players
Mesa Thunderbirds men's basketball players
Philippine Basketball Association All-Stars
Philippine Basketball Association imports
Philippine Patriots players
Power forwards (basketball)
Saint John Mill Rats players
Saint John Riptide players
San Miguel Beermen players
Southern Utah University alumni
Sportspeople from Tempe, Arizona
St. John's Edge players
Townsville Crocodiles players
21st-century African-American sportspeople
20th-century African-American people